City West railway station is a railway station on the Transperth network in Western Australia. It is located on the Fremantle line and Airport line, 1.6 kilometres from Perth station serving the suburb of West Perth.

History
The original West Perth station opened in 1883 as North Perth. It was renamed West Perth in 1890. The station closed on 1 September 1979 along with the rest of the Fremantle line, re-opening on 29 July 1983 when services were restored. On 18 June 1986, a new West Perth station opened on the other side of the West Perth Subway. It was renamed City West on 19 November 1987 in conjunction with the opening of an adjacent Parry Corporation commercial development of the same name. It is now a major transport option for students of the nearby Perth Modern School.

Services
City West station is served by Transperth Fremantle line services from Fremantle to Perth that continue through to Midland via the Midland line, and Airport line services from Claremont to High Wycombe.

It has received Airport line services since 10 October 2022.

City West station saw 514,121 passengers in the 2013–14 financial year.

Platforms

Bus routes

References

External links

Gallery History of Western Australian Railways & Stations

Fremantle line
Railway stations in Perth, Western Australia
Railway stations in Australia opened in 1986
West Perth, Western Australia
Airport line, Perth